Sand Bay is an unincorporated community in the town of Russell, Bayfield County, Wisconsin, United States.  The community is located within the Red Cliff Indian Reservation.

The community is also located 37 miles north-northwest of the city of Ashland.

References

Unincorporated communities in Bayfield County, Wisconsin
Unincorporated communities in Wisconsin
Wisconsin populated places on Lake Superior